Echo Park is the 17th novel by American crime-writer Michael Connelly, and the twelfth featuring the Los Angeles detective Hieronymus "Harry" Bosch. It was published in 2006.

Plot summary 
In 1993, Harry Bosch and his partner Jerry Edgar caught the Marie Gesto case. Marie was a young equestrian who went missing. Her car and clothing turned up in an apartment garage but her body was never found. Bosch and Edgar had pegged a likely culprit – Anthony Garland, the son of wealthy and powerful industrialist Thomas Rex "T-Rex" Garland. The younger Garland had dated a woman who closely resembled Gesto and had broken up with him due to his temper; she also had lived in the apartment where Gesto's car was found. However, despite several rounds of questioning Anthony Garland, a part-time security guard at one of his father's oil facilities, detectives never found enough evidence to charge the suspect and the case went cold. Bosch had worked Gesto case as time allowed, calling her parents several times a year so they knew their daughter was not forgotten.

In the 13 years since the Gesto case went cold, Bosch had retired from the LAPD and worked as a private investigator for three years but returned to the force because things didn't work out the way he thought they would in retirement. Now, nearing 60, Bosch is working in the prestigious Open-Unsolved Unit at Parker Center, going over cold cases with his most recent partner, Kizmin "Kiz" Rider. A serendipitous traffic stop in L.A.'s Echo Park neighborhood nabs Raynard Waits, a man with body parts in his van on the floorboard in front of the front seat. Detective Freddy Olivas is working the case and Richard O'Shea is the prosecutor assigned. Soon Waits has confessed to a string of slayings involving prostitutes and runaways, as well as to two earlier murders: one of pawnshop owner Daniel Fitzpatrick during the 1992 riots, the other of Marie Gesto. When the Gesto case files are reexamined, it seems that Waits had called the police shortly after the murder, pretending to be a tipster, but Bosch and Edgar never followed up on the tip. Without this costly error, Waits could have been implicated within a week of Gesto's disappearance and never gone on to kill more victims.

Bosch takes the Gesto files to his ex-girlfriend Rachel Walling, an FBI agent and former criminal profiler, asking her opinion on the case so he can have an edge in dealing with Waits. Walling suggests that Raynard Waits might not be his true identity. Raynard is an unusual name, reminding Walling of Reynard the Fox: a trickster character from French folklore known for fooling the authorities and living in a secret castle. Bosch and Walling also discuss why Waits might have been carrying the bodies through Echo Park, when nearby Griffith Park offered a much larger and more rugged area to hide human remains. Bosch suspects Waits felt comfortable in Echo Park, and that the investigation into his crimes had overlooked an important connection to this neighborhood. Bosch and Walling also rekindle their romance that ended abruptly several years earlier.

In an interview room with Bosch and several others, Waits confesses to killing Fitzpatrick as a random act during the chaos of the 1992 riots, and to raping and strangling Gesto the next year due to her fitting his fantasy. The disappearance of a middle-class woman attracted too much attention, Waits says, so he subsequently targeted transients and addicts on the fringes of society who would not be missed. He held them captive for several days before killing them. Waits agrees to take police to her body, in exchange for a plea bargain and avoiding the death penalty for any of his crimes. Bosch, O'Shea, Rider, Olivas, a videographer and a forensic investigation team accompany Waits and his attorney Maury Swann to an isolated area in Beachwood Canyon where he leads them to human remains buried in a shallow grave. When departing from the burial site, O'Shea orders Waits's handcuffs removed so he can descend a ladder. Waits uses this opportunity to grab Olivas gun. He shoots three officers, killing Olivas and seriously wounding Rider, and shouts "How's your bullshit deal looking now?" before escaping into the woods. Bosch tends to Rider. She is shot through the neck and bleeding heavily, but stabilized at the hospital. In line with policy for officer-involved shootings, Bosch is taken off active duty pending review of the incident. Forensic dentistry confirms the remains are Gesto's.

In the aftermath of the shooting, Bosch makes two important discoveries: First, he learns that O'Shea has apparently ordered the videotape of the Beachwood Canyon expedition edited to remove his order that Waits's handcuffs be removed, in an attempt to avoid any career-damaging fallout over the incident. Second, in examining copies of case files he made before quitting the police department several years earlier Bosch discovers no evidence that Waits had contacted police shortly after Gesto disappeared. He suspects that the "51 sheets" (typed summaries of handwritten notes) were altered to make him feel rattled and appear responsible for allowing Waits to escape notice and go on to kill several more people. After analyzing the data, Bosch comes to suspect that Olivas and O'Shea doctored the 51 sheets as part of a plot to help O'Shea's bid to become District Attorney by nabbing a serial killer and closing eleven open murders. Waits, Bosch thinks, was not guilty of the Gesto murder but played along to avoid execution and hoping for a possible chance to escape—his parting comment about a "bullshit deal" was presumably directed at O'Shea.

With qualified support from Walling, Bosch sets out to investigate his hunches and find where Waits might be hiding. He finds subtle signs on the Beachwood Canyon trail, like recently-cut tree limbs, that indicate Waits might have been told where to find the burial site despite actually having never been there. Keisha Russell, a reporter friend, confirms that T-Rex Garland was a major (though indirect) contributor to O'Shea's election campaign. This seems to confirm Bosch's idea that Waits' confession to the Gesto murder was fake and intended to permanently clear Anthony Garland of suspicion. A closer look at Olivas' files on Waits shows that because Waits was so obviously guilty detectives did not thoroughly research his background. In Fitzgerald's paperwork, Bosch and Walling discover evidence that the pawnshop owner was not a random victim: he had been murdered by a disgruntled customer named Robert Foxworth who soon afterwards falsified a birth certificate to change his name to Raynard Waits. Abel Pratt, Bosch's commanding officer, cautions him about investigating the case after he was removed from active duty.

In the meantime, Waits has kidnapped another woman by forcing her into a white van. Walling, using her FBI credentials, obtains a copy of Waits' juvenile criminal record in hopes it will contain information about where he might be holding his newest victim. Knowing Waits tends to hold his victims captive for a few days, Bosch races against the clock to locate Waits' hideout in Echo Park. Waits was born to an underage mother whose drug habits and prostitution history led to her losing custody of the boy in his infancy. Waits bounced between foster homes and youth detention facilities for most of his young life, exhibiting extreme anger towards women and finding stability only with the Saxon family who he lived with for four years — in Echo Park.

Bosch and Walling locate the Saxon home, where his elderly foster mother informs them that "Robbie" rents the garage. Walling urges him to wait for backup, but Bosch insists on entering sooner because the kidnapping victim is at risk. They break into the garage and are confronted with a locked room mystery — all three exterior garage doors were locked from the inside, yet there is no sign of Waits. In the white van, Walling discovers duct tape affixed to human hair proving they were on the right track. Suddenly, gunshots ring out, narrowly missing Walling and Bosch. The shots came from behind a large American flag affixed to the wall—a flag that conceals a tunnel built into the hillside abutment on the backside of the house. Bosch crawls into the tunnel, which is filled with human bones from Waits's victims. Hearing the victim's whimpers, Bosch knows she is alive and attempts to establish rapport with Waits. He explains he knows Waits's real name and how they were both shuttled into the Los Angeles foster care system due to troubled mothers. Waits admits that his lawyer Maury Swann approached him with the plea bargain and false confession, which he accepted only because it gave him a chance to escape. Bosch urges Waits to turn himself in, but in the end is forced to shoot and kill him.

Bosch confronts O'Shea with Waits's final confession, but O'Shea denies any wrongdoing. Pratt issues a veiled warning to Bosch, saying that while the Waits shooting appears justified that verdict might change depending on forensic investigation of the Saxon house, and that high-ranking LAPD officers have decided they support O'Shea in the upcoming election. Any scandal that harms O'Shea might be blamed on Bosch, and the forensic data could be slanted to make the shooting seem unjustified. Refusing to play along, Bosch learns from his partner Jerry Edgar that Pratt had been following him continually since he was removed from active duty. Bosch reevaluates his presumptions, now coming to believe that the 51 sheets were most likely altered by Pratt and that Olivas and O'Shea were probably duped along with him. The only question is why Pratt, a decorated veteran approaching retirement, would take such an action. Surveillance proves that Pratt is cheating on his wife with a much younger woman who works in the police personnel office. In a divorce, Pratt could lose everything and thus might be desperate for cash.

At Swann's house, Bosch and Walling discover Pratt has forced Swann (who can't swim) into the swimming pool as an intimidation tactic to keep him silent, and overhear damning details of the plot to make Waits take responsibility for the Gesto murder. They arrest both men, and Pratt offers Bosch a deal. If prosecutors agree that Pratt will serve no jail time and keeps his pension plan, he will go on the record saying that Olivas and O'Shea were not involved and further will obtain evidence that the Garlands are behind the scheme, with Anthony Garland leading Pratt to Gesto's hidden grave. Bosch reluctantly agrees, deciding that letting Pratt go free is a price worth paying to finally catch Marie Gesto's killer. Pratt meets the Garlands in a public park to demand more money due to the unexpected complications in the case. An FBI team, along with O'Shea, use video cameras and parabolic microphones to record the conversation. T-Rex Garland admits to paying $1 million to Pratt to shift blame from his son to Raynard Waits. When Pratt goes to the men's room to communicate with the FBI team, Anthony Garland follows him and shoots him to death. Moments later, the FBI arrive at the men's room and shoot Garland when he refuses to comply.

Rachel Walling confronts Bosch with her suspicions that he orchestrated the shooting of Pratt, having known that Anthony Garland was hot-tempered and had a concealed carry permit for a handgun due to his security guard job. He denies it, but she departs in anger. Kiz Rider is released from the hospital, telling Bosch that she has decided to change careers to an office job with the LAPD chief of police where, she says, she can possibly protect him from bureaucracy and office politics. He approves, glad that she will be one floor above him like a guardian angel.

Trivia 
Raynard Waits was described as a former client of Mickey Haller, a defense attorney character who also stars in a series of books by Connelly. However, this book has no mention of Haller's kinship to Harry Bosch.

Cecil C. Dobbs, a character featured in The Lincoln Lawyer from the Haller series, was described as working for the family of the wealthy suspect.

Harry Bosch gives his cell phone number out in the book. Those who dial the number reach a voice mail account for Harry Bosch and can leave a message.

The first chapter was adapted as a short film.  Tim Abell played Bosch, whilst crime author Gar Anthony Haywood played Jerry Edgar. Len Cariou was the narrator.

Raynard Waits was portrayed by Jason Gedrick in the TV adaptation Bosch.

Jason Gedrick who played Raynard Waits in the “Bosch” TV adaptation (2015-)  and Tim Abel who played Bosch in the Echo Park short film, both starred in the TV show “Trouble Creek”, 2017 

2006 American novels
Harry Bosch series
Novels set in Los Angeles
Little, Brown and Company books